Victor Gevers is a Dutch security hacker.

Career 
He has been hacking since 1998 and is running the GDI Foundation.

In 2019 he discovered a large data breach of the Chinese surveillance company SenseNets.

He is known for claiming to have hacked the Twitter account of U.S. President Donald Trump. He was not convicted for it.

References

External links 

 Twitter profile of Victor Gevers

Living people
Hackers
Year of birth missing (living people)